Socialism in Iran or Iranian socialism is a political ideology that traces its beginnings to the 20th century and encompasses various political parties in the country. Iran experienced a short Third World Socialism period at the zenith of the Tudeh Party after the abdication of Reza Shah and his replacement by his son, Mohammad Reza Pahlavi (though the party never rose to power). After failing to reach power, this form of third world socialism was replaced by Mosaddegh's populist, non-aligned Iranian nationalism of the National Front party as the main anti-monarchy force in Iran, reaching power (1949–1953), and it remained with that strength even in opposition (after the overthrowing of Mossadegh) until the rise of Islamism and the Iranian Revolution. The Tudehs have moved towards basic socialist communism since then.

Iranian Socialist organizations during 1900–1979

Social Democratic Party 

In 1904 or 1905, the Social Democratic Party was formed by Persian emigrants in Transcaucasia with the help of local revolutionaries, maintaining close ties to the Russian Social Democratic Labour Party and Hemmat Party. It was the first Iranian socialist organization. The party created its own mélange of European socialism and indigenous ideas and upheld liberalism and nationalism. It maintained some religious beliefs while being critical of the conservative ulama and embracing separation of church and state. It was founded by Haydar Khan Amo-oghli and led by Nariman Narimanov.

Unified Socialist Party and Social Reformers Party 

During the constitutional period, the Unified Socialist and Social Reformers Party were both socialist political parties in Persia. The Social Reformers Party was considered to follow a moderate line in comparison to the Democrat Party and the Social Democratic Party's economic platform, but opposed the landlords likewise.

Union and Progress Party

Democrat Party 

Founded in 1909 in Qajari Persia during the constitutional period, the Democrat Party was one of two major parliamentary parties at the time alongside its rival, the Moderate Socialists Party. The party had a social democrat ideology, initially was an offshoot of the Transcaucasia-based Social Democratic Party. It severed direct ties with Baku and dropped "Socialist" from the name in deference to the conservative public. Its ideology, however, remained heavily borrowed from the old party. It was largely composed of middle-class intellectuals and stood for the separation of church and state.

In 1918, the party had split definitively into the Pro-Reorganization Democrats led by Bahar; and the Anti-Reorganization Democrats.

Notable members were Hassan Taqizadeh and Haydar Khan Amo-oghli.

Socialist Revolutionary Party 

Founded in the 1900s, the Socialist Revolutionary Party, also known as Social-Revolutionaries, was a Persian revolutionary socialist party based in Baku, Caucasus Viceroyalty. It was one of the most important parties established by the Persian emigrants in Transcaucasia during Qajar dynasty. The party published an Azerbaijani language newspaper twice a week, named Ekinçi ve Fe'le and edited by Hosayn Israfilbekov.

Communist Party of Persia 
Originally established as the Justice Party in 1917, the Communist Party of Iran was an Iranian communist party founded by former Social Democratic Party's members who supported Baku-based Bolsheviks, the party participated in Third International in 1919 and was renamed to the Communist Party of Iran in 1920.

Socialist Party 

During the 1920s, the Socialist Party was a leading left-wing political party that was close to the Tudeh Party of Iran and it joined the Tudeh-led United Front of Progressive Parties in 1946, effectively absorbed by the larger group. The roots of the Socialist Party lay in the Democrat Party, a reformist group active in the first two decades of the twentieth century. Following the disintegration of this movement those members who retained faith in the masses and hoped to mobilise the lower and middle classes grouped together under the Socialist Party banner in 1921. The party was led by Sulayman Eskandari, Muhammad Musavat and Qasim Khan Sur as well as Muhammad Sadiq Tabatabai, a member of a leading clerical family recruited largely to hold off the inevitable attacks from conservative clerics. Their main newspaper, Toufan (Storm), was edited by the outspoken and controversial poet Mohammad Farrokhi Yazdi.

Branches were set up in Rasht, Qazvin, Bandar Anzali, Tabriz, Mashhad, Kerman and Kermanshah although Tehran was the main base of operations and it was in the capital that the party founded four newspapers and established affiliated groups such as the Union of Employees in the Ministry of Post and Telegraph, a Tenants Association and Patriotic Women's Society. The latter group campaigned for a wider role for women in Iranian society, promoting such initiatives as education for girls and wider provisions for women's health. It had been established in 1922 by Mohtaram Eskandari and quickly affiliated to her husband's party.

The party's programme called for the eventual establishment of equality in society, nationalisation of the means of production, irrigation schemes, a new level of regional government, a free and equal judiciary, the rights of free speech, free assembly and trade union rights, free elections, wider access to education, improved working conditions including an end to child labour and government intervention against unemployment. The party gained some support, attracting 2500 members in Tehran alone soon after its formation.

Along with the Reformist Party, the Revival Party and the Communist Party the Socialist Party was one of the four groups courted by Rezā Shāh as he made his play for the throne of Persia. Along with the Revival Party it formed a working majority in the Iranian parliament that allowed Reza Khan, as he was still known, he form his own reformist government. Khan soon broke from the Socialists and threw in his lot with more conservative elements when he decided to abandon plans for a republic and instead establish himself as king. 134 The part was one of the few in parliament not to actively support Reza's rise to the throne, arguing that despite their support for many of his reforms their republican principles prevented them from endorsing him as a monarch. Following Rezā Shāh's ascension to the throne the Socialist Party disappeared as part of a wider crackdown on anti-monarchist dissent. Iskandari was forced to retire from public life and mobs were organised to harass the party and attack their properties. A Socialist Theatre in Enzeli was razed to the ground by a police-led mob on the pretext that during a performance of Tartuffe a female actor had been on stage whilst in Tehran the Patriotic Women's Society was stoned and their library burnt down. A minor group of the same name emerged in 1944 when radical members of the Comrades Party broke from that group over its failure to support striking workers in Isfahan.

Young Communist League of Persia 
Founded in the midst of the Gilan Revolution, the Young Communist League of Persia was a communist youth organization in Persia set up following the July 31, 1920 split between the communist and non-communist Jangali elements. The YCL of Persia conducted agitation and propaganda activities and organized armed actions against the followers of Kuchik Khan. The organization was crushed after the defeat of the Gilan soviet.

In 1927 different communist youth groups merged, recreating the YCL of Persia. It was a section of the Young Communist International. In the fall of 1928, the organization was suppressed along with other left groups.

Revolutionary Republican Party of Iran 
Founded in late 1924 by Iranian diaspora in Germany, the Revolutionary Republican Party of Iran was a moderate leftwing political party in Persia with socialist reformist tendencies that published its platform in 1926.

Jungle Party 

Active in northern Iran during the 1940s, the Jungle Party was a secessionist, nationalist and socialist party founded by armed rebels who tried to revive the Persian Socialist Soviet Republic created in 1921 and used its red flag as a symbol. and some of Mirza Kuchik Khan's old associates It allied with the Iran Party, Tudeh Party of Iran, Democratic Party of Iranian Kurdistan and Azerbaijani Democratic Party in 1946.

Iran Party 

Established in 1941, the Iran Party is described as the "backbone of the National Front", the leading umbrella organization of Iranian nationalists. Founded by mostly of European-educated technocrats, it advocated "a diluted form of French socialism" (i.e. it "modeled itself on" the moderate Socialist Party of France) and promoted social democracy, liberal nationalism and secularism. The socialist tent of the party was more akin to that of the Fabian Society than to the scientific socialism of Karl Marx. Its focus on liberal socialist and democratic socialist principles, made it quite different from pure left-wing parties and it did not show much involvement in labour rights discussions. The Iran Party's basic nucleus were members of the Iranian Engineers’ Association. In the Iranian legislative election of 1944, five of the party's leaders including Rezazadeh Shafaq, Ghulam'Ali Farivar, AhdulHamid Zanganeh, Hussein Mu'aven, and Abdallah Mu'azemi won seats, as well as Mohammad Mossadegh who was not a member but the party effectively supported. The party helped Mossadegh establish the National Front, nationalize the oil industry and rise to power. Some members held office during Mosaddegh government. In the 1950s, the party was led by Karim Sanjabi and Allah-Yar Saleh. It was suppressed following the British–American backed coup d'état in 1953 and was outlawed in 1957, on the grounds that it had an alliance with the Tudeh Party of Iran ten years earlier. It was revived in 1960 and actively contributed to the National Front (II), which was disintegrated in 1963 and forced to survive secretly. Iran Party held a congress in 1964. Not much is known about the activities of the party between 1964 and the mid-1970s except of some irregular meetings and exchanging views. In 1977, alongside League of Socialists and Nation Party it revived the National Front (IV) and demanded Ruhollah Khomeini's return to Iran. In early 1979, then secretary-general of the party, Shapour Bakhtiar was appointed as the last Prime Minister by the Shah and included two Iran Party members in his cabinet. The party however denounced his acceptance of the post, expelled him and called him a "traitor". The party did not play an important role in Iranian political arena after 1979 and was soon declared banned.

Comrades Party 

During the 1940s, the Comrades Party was part of a wave of political groupings established in the early 1940s following the removal of Rezā Shāh. The party was formed in November 1942 by Mustafa Fateh, a British-educated economist who was close to the Tudeh Party of Iran but who disliked the close relationship which that party had with the Soviet Union. Fateh, who had been an important figure in the Anglo-Iranian Oil Company edited the Tudeh paper Mardom for a time before establishing his own journal, Emruz va Farda. Abbas Narraqi, another founding member had been one of 53 men imprisoned in 1937 on charges of conspiring to lead a communist revolution.

The Comrades Party called for two main aims i.e. political equality to all Iranians and nationalisation of the means of production. It put forward ten candidates in the 1944 election, all of whom came from professional backgrounds. Two members of the Comrades Party were elected to the Majlis of Iran where they sat with the Individuals' Caucus, a group they made up along with the Iran Party and various independents, all of whom largely followed the lead of Mohammad Mosaddegh.

The party split in 1944, following a dispute in Isfahan where clashes between striking workers and local tribes loyal to the Shah had broken out amid accusations that the workers were attempting to lead a communist revolution. The Majlis-based wing of the Comrades Party condemned the workers and affirmed their loyalty to the Shah but another external group joined Tudeh in supporting the strikers and this group, which maintained control of Emruz va Farda, broke away to form the Socialist Party.

Movement of God-Worshipping Socialists 

Founded in 1943, Movement of God-Worshipping Socialists was one of six original member organizations of the National Front. The party was led by Muhammed Nakhshab. The organization was founded through the merger of two groupings, Nakhshab's circle of high school students at Dar al-Fanoun and Jalaleddin Ashtiyani's circle of about 25 students at the Faculty of Engineering at Tehran University. The organization was initially known as League of Patriotic Muslims. It combined religious sentiments, nationalism and socialist thoughts.

Nakhshab is credited with the first synthesis between Shi'ism and European socialism. Nakhshab's movement was based on the tenet that Islam and socialism were not incompatible, since both sought to accomplish social equality and justice. His theories had been expressed in his B.A. thesis on the laws of ethics.

Azerbaijani Democratic Party

United Front of Progressive Parties 
From 1946 to 1948, the United Front of Progressive Parties was a political alliance of left-wing parties in Iran originally founded by the communist Tudeh Party and the socialist Iran Party, they invited other parties to join them in their alleged struggle for "social progress and national independence". One of the main planks of the united front was to recognize Central Council of United Trade Unions as the sole legitimate organization of the working-class in Iran.

Iran Unity Party 

The Iran Unity Party was a socialist political party that split the Iran Party following its alliance with the communist Tudeh Party of Iran in 1946. According to Leonard Binder, the party was in a coalition with the National Union Party and Socialist Party in the 14th parliament.

Toilers Party of the Iranian Nation 

Founded on 16 May 1951 by Mozzafar Baghai, the Toilers Party of the Iranian Nation was a social-democratic political party, initially a member of the National Front, that pledged support for the nationalization of the Iran oil industry and opposed Tudeh Party. They successfully attracted a considerable amount of educated youth (especially in the University of Tehran), Third Force activists and shopkeepers from Kerman in bazzar. Yet the party also included a nucleus of čāqukeš and čumāqdār.

In the 1952 legislative election, the party won two seats by Baghai and Zohari. The party split in 1952 over its relationship with Government of Mosaddegh. Under leadership of Mozzafar Baghai, Toilers left National Front and openly opposed the government while Khalil Maleki reestablished Third Force under the name of Toilers Party of the Iranian Nation — Third Force and continued to support the government.

Toilers formed an alliance with Society of Mujahed Muslims, led by Ayatollah Kashani, pooling their resources and coordinating their activities against government. They actively participated in the 1953 coup d'état and called it a "national uprising", however opposed Fazlollah Zahedi's post-coup military government. Following their opposition, their newspapers was banned and their party office was confiscated by the government and the party went on a hiatus until Iranian legislative election, 1960. They resumed activity in 1961 and expressed support for Ayatollah Khomeini in 5 June 1963 demonstrations. In 1971, the party was reorganized with the permission of the government, but was forced to cease its activities in 1975 after announcement of the one-party state under Resurgence Party. In 1977, Baghai made an attempt to revive the party after declaring loyalty to the Pahlavi dynasty, albeit at restricted level. It was soon after dissolved after the revolution of 1979.

League of Iranian Socialists 

In 1960, the League of Socialists of the National Movement of Iran or Society of Iranian Socialists was founded by Third Force activists led by Khalil Maleki and a number of radical nationalists, most of whom had social democratic leanings and some members with Islamic socialist tendencies. Hossein Malek, Ahmad Sayyed Javadi and Jalal Al-e-Ahmad were among people associated with the group. The party of socialist and nationalist ideology, formally joined the Socialist International upon establishment.

The organization was a founding member of the National Front (II) and was considered the "extreme left-wing" within the front. It broke with the front and joined the National Democratic Front after the Iranian Revolution. In the Iranian presidential election, 1980, the group supported People's Mujahedin of Iran nominee Massoud Rajavi.

Organization of Iranian People's Fedai Guerrillas 

Founded in 1963, the Organization of Iranian People's Fedai Guerrillas (OIPFG) was a Marxist-Leninist underground guerrilla organization that pursued ideologically an Anti-imperialist agenda and embraced armed propaganda to justify its revolutionary armed struggle against Iran's monarchy system. They also believed in Materialism. They rejected reformism, and were inspired by thoughts of Mao Zedong, Che Guevara, and Régis Debray. Bijan Jazani, known as the "intellectual father" of the organization, contributed to its ideology by writing a series of pamphlets such as Struggle against the Shah's Dictatorship, What a Revolutionary Must Know and How the Armed Struggle Will Be Transformed into a Mass Struggle?. The pamphlets were followed by Masoud Ahmadzadeh's treatise Armed Struggle: Both a Strategy and a Tactic and The Necessity of Armed Struggle and the Rejection of the Theory of Survival by Amir Parviz Pouyan.

They criticized the National Front and the Liberation Movement as "Petite bourgeoisie paper organizations still preaching the false hope of peaceful change". Fedai Guerrillas initially criticized the Soviet Union and the Tudeh Party as well, however they later abandoned the stance as a result of cooperation with the socialist camp.

In June 1973 the organization merged with the People's Democratic Front. Ideological differences had existed between the People's Democratic Front and OIPFG. Front's members opposed Leninism, which they saw as a deviation from Marxism.

Organization of Communist Revolutionaries (Marxist–Leninist) 

Founded in 1969, the Organization of Communist Revolutionaries (Marxist–Leninist) was formed in opposition to the Shah regime in Iran and was active in the Iranian student movement in exile. It was a Marxism–Leninist and Maoist ideology and it merged with Union of Iranian Communists (Sarbedaran).

Union of Iranian Communists (Sarbedaran)

Peykar 

Founded in 1975, the Organization of Struggle for the Emancipation of the Working Class, or Peykar, also called the Marxist Mojahedin, was a secular splinter group from the People's Mujahedin of Iran (PMoI), the largest of Iran's opposition groups. Its members broke away from the PMoI to support of secular Marxism Leninism. Its leader were Alireza Sepasi-Ashtiani and Hossein Rouhani By the early 1980s Peykar was no longer considered active.

Movement of Militant Muslims 
Founded in 1977, the Movement of Militant Muslims is an Iranian Islamic socialist political group led by Habibollah Payman. The group had been revolutionary and is close to Council of Nationalist-Religious Activists of Iran. The party's ideology is Islamic socialism, Social democracy and Anti-imperialism.

Union of Communist Militants 

Founded in December 1978, the Union of Communist Militants (EMK) was an Iranian maoist group founded by Mansoor Hekmat. It took part in the Iranian Revolution of 1979 — marked by the creation of workers' councils (shoras). Because of mounting repression in Iran, the organisation sought refuge in Kurdistan in 1981. In Kurdistan, the organization merged with a Kurdish group of Maoist roots, Komalah. Together, they formed the Communist Party of Iran (CPI) in September 1983.

Iranian Socialist organizations after 1979

Organization of Iranian People's Fedaian (Majority)

Iranian People's Fedai Guerrillas 

Founded in  April 1979, the Iranian People's Fedai Guerrillas (IFPG), also known as Dehghani faction, after its leader Ashraf Dehghani, is an Iranian communist organization that split from the Organization of Iranian People's Fedai Guerrillas (OIFPG) in 1979, dropping the word 'organization' from its name. Dehghani broke away from the OIFPG when these accused it of deviating from the strategy of guerrilla warfare. From the early days of Iranian Revolution, the group claimed to be the "sole genuine communist organization" and opposed the Islamic Republic. Reportedly, as much as 30% of OIFPG members joined the group and fought in the 1979 Kurdish rebellion against government forces, backing the Democratic Party of Iranian Kurdistan. Surviving members of the group and its factions moved to Europe in the 1990s.

Organization of Working-class Freedom Fighters 

Founded in 1979, the Organization of Working-class Freedom Fighters or simply Razmandegan was a communist party in Iran that opposed both the Soviet line and the guerrilla doctrine.

Fedaian Organisation (Minority) 

Founded in 1980, the Fedaian Organisation (Minority) was an Iranian Marxist-Leninist organisation and an offshoot of the Organization of Iranian People's Fedai Guerrillas, it split over the dispute with the majority faction, adhering to the original militant policy of the group, opposing the Tudeh Party and insisted on challenging the Islamic Republic. In January 1982, it was joined by "Organization of Iranian People's Fedaian-Majority Left Wing" led by Moṣṭafā Madani, an offshoot of Organization of Iranian People's Fedaian (Majority) that broke away from the latter in October 1980.

Organization of Iranian People's Fedai Guerrillas – Followers of the Identity Platform

Communist Party of Iran

Organization of Iranian People's Fedai Guerrillas (1985)

References

 
Iran